Mobbs is an English surname. Notable people with the surname include:

 Edgar Mobbs (1882–1917), English rugby union footballer
 Nigel Mobbs (1937–2005), businessman and Lord Lieutenant of Buckinghamshire
 Noel Mobbs (1878–1959), founder of Slough Estates

See also
Dobbs (surname)
Hobbs (surname)

English-language surnames
Surnames from given names